Bonaventura Lamberti (c. 1653 – 19 September 1721) was an Italian painter of the Baroque period, active mainly in Rome. He was born at Carpi, and after some years working at Modena, he became a pupil of the painter Carlo Cignani in Rome. There, he became attached to the household of the Marchese Gabrieli. In Rome, he painted St. Francis of Paola resuscitating a dead Child for the church of the Spirito Santo de Napolitani. He painted some cartoons used for mosaics for St. Peter's basilica by Ottaviani. His  Virgin showing the Infant Saviour to St. Jerome was engraved by Ludovico Dorigny. Among those who worked with him was Marco Benefial. He died in Rome.

References

1650s births
1721 deaths
Artists from Carpi, Emilia-Romagna
17th-century Italian painters
Italian male painters
18th-century Italian painters
Italian Baroque painters
18th-century Italian male artists